Motyzhyn is a village in Bucha Raion (district) in Kyiv Oblast of Ukraine, at about 45km west of Kyiv city. It belongs to Makariv settlement hromada, one of the hromadas of Ukraine. 

Until 18 July 2020, Motyzhyn was located in Makariv Raion. The raion was abolished that day as part of the administrative reform of Ukraine, which reduced the number of raions of Kyiv Oblast to seven. The area of Makariv Raion was split between Bucha and Fastiv Raions, with Motyzhyn being transferred to Bucha Raion.

In April 2022, the Ukrainian interior ministry reported that Olga Sukhenko, the mayor, and her family were shot, killed and buried in a shallow grave. Their bodies were found after Russian troops withdrew from the area. Motyzhyn had been occupied by Russian forces during the 2022 Russian invasion of Ukraine from 27 February until its liberation on 28 March.

References 
Villages in Bucha Raion

External links